Sebastian Ofner (born 12 May 1996) is an Austrian professional tennis player. He has a career high ATP singles ranking of World No. 126 achieved on 6 May 2019. He was a semifinalist at the 2017 Generali Open Kitzbühel in his home country.

Professional career

2017: ATP and Grand Slam debut at Wimbledon & third round
Ofner made his ATP main draw debut at the 2017 Wimbledon Championships after going through qualifying, defeating Kimmer Coppejans, Miljan Zekić and Jay Clarke. In the first round, he beat Thomaz Bellucci in straight sets. In the next round, he upset world No. 18 Jack Sock in a five-setter.

In August, Ofner caused another surprise in front of his home crowd at the 2017 Generali Open Kitzbühel by defeating first seed Pablo Cuevas as a wildcard in the second round. He then won over Renzo Olivo to reach the semifinals where he fell to João Sousa.

2018: Maiden Challenger title
Ofner won his maiden ATP Challenger title at the President's Cup in Astana.

2022: French Open debut
At the 2022 French Open he qualified to make his Grand Slam main draw debut at this Major. He lost to World No. 3 Alexander Zverev in the first round.

Challenger and Futures finals

Singles: 18 (8–10)

Doubles: 10 (3–7)

Singles performance timeline 

Current through the 2022 French Open.

References

External links
 
 
 

1996 births
Living people
Austrian male tennis players
People from Bruck an der Mur
Sportspeople from Styria
21st-century Austrian people